Count Luigi Corti (24 October 1823 – 19 February 1888), Italian diplomat, was born at Gambarana in the Kingdom of Lombardy–Venetia (present-day Province of Pavia).

Biography
Early involved with Benedetto Cairoli in anti-Austrian conspiracies, he was exiled to Turin, where he entered the Piedmontese foreign office. After serving as artillery officer through the campaign of 1848, he was in 1850 appointed secretary of legation in London, whence he was promoted minister to various capitals, and in 1875 ambassador to Constantinople, representing Italy at the 1876 Constantinople Conference.

Called by Cairoli to the direction of foreign affairs in 1878, he represented the Kingdom of Italy in the Congress of Berlin, but unwisely declined Lord Derby's offer for an Anglo-Italian agreement in defence of common interests. At Berlin he sustained the cause of Greek independence, but in all other respects remained isolated, and excited the wrath of his countrymen by returning to Italy with empty hands.

For a time he withdrew from public life, but in 1881 was again sent to Constantinople by Cairoli, where he presided over the futile conference of ambassadors upon the Egyptian question. In 1886, he was transferred to the London embassy, but was recalled by Crispi in the following year after a misunderstanding.

Honors
 Grand cordon of the Order of Saints Maurice and Lazarus 

 Knight Grand Cross of the Order of the Crown of Italy

See also 
 Ministry of Foreign Affairs (Italy)
 Foreign relations of Italy

References

1823 births
1888 deaths
People from the Province of Pavia
Foreign ministers of Italy
Ambassadors of Italy to the Ottoman Empire
19th-century Italian diplomats